Didwana is the city, nearby of Nagaur city in Didwana district of Rajasthan, India. The lion gateway of Marwar in Rajasthan and the archway of Merta, known as Abhanagri and Upakashi, is situated on the northern side of Didwana Salt lake in the north-eastern direction of Nagaur district. It is currently the additional district headquarters of Nagaur district,  6 tehsils of East Nagaur are Didwana, Ladnun, Kuchaman, Nawa, Makrana and Parbatsar. The people of Didwana speak the Rajasthani language of Marwadi, a language in the Indo-Aryan family similar to Hindi.

City of Blood Donation 
Dr.Sohan Choudhary: -
The credit for bringing revolution of blood donation in Didwana goes to revolutionary blood hero Dr. Sohan Choudhary. Till date, Dr. Sohan Chaudhary has organised more than 400 blood donation camps. In the surrounding area and in the blood banks of the area, he has his own distinct identity.  keep an image
Didwana ranks first in Rajasthan in terms of blood donation. There is so much enthusiasm about blood donation here that people celebrate their family's birthday or death by donating blood. Since 2001, an average of 10 blood donation camps have been organised in Didwana every year on an average, with an average of 3000 units of blood donation. Since 2001,approx 150000 units of blood donated in per year
 
In September 2017, in 2 blood donation camps held in a span of 15 days, 1353 and 1567 units of blood were collected respectively, which is a record. Earlier, 1051 blood donation was given in April 2017, 1262 in September 2016, 922 in August 2016 and 511 units in January 2013. In view of the enthusiasm of blood donation, after a lot of efforts, a 300-unit capacity blood bank was established in February 2019 at the Government Bangur Hospital. The capacity of which was increased due to the blood donation. Since February 2019, 1825 units of blood have been donated to this blood bank, which is a record.

History 

There is no compiled history of Didwana, but the excavation done here has shown that this is a lower Paleolithic culture site so the activities of one of the earliest ancestors of mankind have taken place here. Two sandy mounds 700 meters wide and 300 meters wide have been witness to human development in the flow of Bangal Canal near the city. Geophysicist Prof. V.N. of Deccan College, Pune. Mishra and SN Rajguru excavated here in the 1980s. He found around 1300 artifacts including small tools, large cutting tools such as chaperos, polyhandros, sparoids. His radio dating age is estimated at 7 lakh 97 thousand years. The Archaeological Survey of India has named these mounds 16R. The Archaeological Survey of India will conserve these earthen mounds for the first time in its history. Cleary Gaylard of the Prehistoric Department of the National Natural History Museum, Paris, and his colleagues conducted research on 16R.

The history of Didwana is said to be about 2000 years old based on inscriptions. According to an inscription, between 43 AD to 255 AD, a city was established in the name of "Abhanagri", which was under the Kushan Empire, 3 km east of the present city. In the course of time, this city was destroyed by the attacks of the Kshatrapas. According to another inscription, Nagabhatta II donated 1/6 of the Didwana region to a Brahmin in 843 AD in the ninth century. Dedushah, son of Prime Minister Sesharam of the same region, resettled the city at the present place under the name Deduvanak, which was later called Didwana. After this, its rule passed to the Pratiharas of Mandore. The statue of Pratihara Kalin Narayan was received from Didwana which is currently kept in Jodhpur Museum.
During this time, Didwana also became the center of Jainism and Hinduism, but due to the Muslim invasions, the ancient temples were destroyed here. Even today, in the old city, there are pieces and sculptures of temples found in the excavation. In the tenth century, the Jain monk, Jineshwar Suri, composed the story in Didwana. Renowned Jain scholar Sridatta Suri traveled to Didwana and preached to Yashobhadra, the ruler here. Yashobhadra constructed a huge Jain temple named Chaubisa Himalaya in Didwana which was in existence till 1184 AD, Somprabhacharya mentions this district in 1184 AD. Jain statues found in the excavation are proof of this. Didwana is also mentioned in the Sakalatirtha Mala, composed by Siddhasen Suri in the twelfth century.

After the Battle of Tarain, this area passed into the hands of Muhammad Ghori, after him Qutubuddin Aibak, Iltutmish and Razia Sultan . Didwana was also captured by the kings of Gujarat for salt. Maharana Kumbha of chittorgarh conquered it and imposed a tax on salt which is mentioned in the inscription of Kirti Stambha. The Mughals established their police stations here. During this time, the Mughals built mosques here. Rao Maldeo of Jodhpur conferred the Jagiri of Didwana to his commander Rao Kumpa. Kumpa fought a battle with Sher Shah Suri here. From the hands of the Mughals, it again went under the state of Jodhpur. In 1708 AD, Didwana was also ruled jointly by the state of Jodhpur and Jaipur. After this, the Nawab of Jhunjhunu also subjected Didwana to his princely state. The Marathas also attacked Didwana and Daulatpura and captured them. In the middle of the 18th century, the King of Jodhpur, Maharaja Bakhat Singh merged it into the princely state of Marwar. After this, Didwana remained the pargana of the state of Jodhpur, under which Ladnun, Badi Beri, Nahwa, Leli and Tosina Jagiri were located. After independence, the state of Jodhpur merged with Rajasthan in 1950 and became the present form of Nagaur district in which Didwana was included.

Didwana has been a major trading center in the medieval Mughal Empire due to the famous salt lake here, from which salt has been prepared and sent all over India. A number of battles were brought between the emperors of Gujarat and the rulers of Jodhpur, Bikaner, Jaipur, over the rights to this lake. Maharana Kumbha of Chittorgarh levied a tax on salt, which is mentioned in the inscription of the Kirti Pillar, it is the second important and big lake after Sambhar Lake in Rajasthan which covers an area of ten square kilometers. Didwana was a pargana (district) of the princely state of Marwar (Jodhpur) before independence, which was later annexed into Nagaur district after independence. Located on the eastern border of Jodhpur state, this city has also been the confluence site of Marwar, Shekhawati and Bikaner princely states. This is the reason why there is a mixed influence of the three princely states on the language, customs, etc. of the residents here.

It is also said to be origin center of the Niranjani community and Maheshwari community and the hometown of the country's famous industrialist Bangur family. This Didwana is very ancient, which is said to have been in existence for almost two thousand years, but human activities have been going on for millions of years, the evidence of which is the tools found in excavation by archaeological department. On the basis of a historical inscription, this city was established by the name of Abhanagari in the east direction from the present city in 43 CE, which was under the Kushan Empire. According to local legends, the rulers of the Kshatrap kingdom were destroyed due to the invasions and Didushah, the son of Sesharam Maheshwari, the prime minister of this city, established Didwana Nagar at its present place. Didushah was also known as Diduvanak and which later degenerated into the name of Didwana.

Nowadays Didwana is a well-known town of Nagaur/Rajasthan. Many people of Didwana and nearby places are well settled elsewhere in India and hold important positions or are famous industrialists. And also owns technology startups, business investment and funding firm. The famous Maheshwari billionaire business family Bangur hails from Didwana.

The Shree Shyam Maharaj Ji Ka Mandir is famous since 400 years old. Further it is also known for two famous old maths based on the Ramanuja Sampradaya, namely, the Jahlaria Math headed by Sri Sri 1008 Swami Ghanshyamacharyaji Maharaj and The Nagoria Math headed by Sri Sri 1008 Swami Vishnu prapannacharyaji Maharaj. The city is historically known for Fort Mosque (Qila Mosque) built by Emperor Akbar in the memory of Sufi Saint.

Didwana is also known for health care facilities, some accredited hospitals like Banger Hospital, Station road, Omax hospital, Godara Market deliver good healthcare services in Rajasthan.
Omax group of hospitals started from this city. Its channel found all over Rajasthan. it is an Ayurveda base hospital.
People comes from other state to get treatment of asthma, infertility, renal stone, de-addiction. But from 2017  famous Dr Sanskar Upadhyay founder of this group of hospitals  now giving services under government of rajasthan namely  government Banger Hospital. He is treating patients with agnikarma and ancient ayurveda medicine,in government Banger Hospital many patients of other state comes and getting treatment.

The city has a Hindu culture, tradition and philosophy and the Maths are a must-visit for all the Baas and basinies. As the surrounding areas of town, the Mathura Das Ji Ka Jaav, the well built by the Maharaja of Jodhpur in the 12th century, in Gaadha baas, inside the well at 107 feet below surface level is a secret chamber deep inside the well where it is said that the hero of the first Indian rebellion, Vijay Singh Pathik, had stayed inside the well's chamber. The property is under the prestigious Pareek family from past 450 Years and is a very good example of ancient Rajasthani architecture.

The temples of these maths are generally regarded to be very beautiful, though they may not be as big as other temples but they are regarded very highly by the Hindu community.

The town is famous for its VED Vidhalya where Brahmin students are taught about Veda, dharma and other aspects of the Hindu religion.

Among the most prominent muslim population inside the town, the descendants of Prophet Muhammad ﷺ from the lineage of Imam Hussain (peace be upon him and his holy household) still lives in the town around the legendary Qila masjid which was constructed upon the orders of then mughal king Akbar in the honour of revered descendant of prophet Muhammad ﷺ and the most prominent sufi saint; Khwaja Moinuddin chisti.

Geography 
It has an average elevation of 336 metres (1102 feet). City divided in 40 Wards. It is an important station of Jodhpur-Delhi Broad gauge rail route of North West Railway Jodhpur division.

These are the famous twelve villages (Baasni) around Didwana, where deshwali community lives.
  Ramsabas - Located on south from the salt lake. 4 km from Didwana on Ganesh Mandir road.
  Ladabas - Adjacent to Ramsabas. Both the villages are mingled down now. Common government school for both villages.
  Khatiabasni 2 km south from Ramsabas on Barangana road.
  Baliya - famous sodium sulfide factory by Nagori is located in Baliya.
  Amarpura - next to Didwana railway station.
  Gardejiabasni - in the west
  Dadubasni - in the west
  Shekhabasni - Located on east side of Didwana at the junction of State highway - Didwana road
  Khinchiyabasni
  Mallabasni
  Daulatpura- Located 12 km east from Didwana on State highway
  Kyath Basani

Following are the famous chowk in Didwana. Chowk means locality.
 Mohallah Sayedan and Qauziyaan
 Narsingh Chowk Near Nagoria Math
 Shyam Ji ka Chowk Near Shayam Ji Ka Mandir
 Nimda ki gali, Deen Darwaja Road
 Kote Maholla 
 Gaggro ka chowk
 kunjar para
 salt rode choraya
 tarsport area
 new Eidgha Rode
 Mataji ki padiya
 hamid colony new eidgha
 elayoki dani salt rode
 Bangur Chowk
 Ganpati Nagar (Dojraj Mandir)
 Ghodawato Ka Chowk
 Bhargav Chowk
 Majejio ka Chowk Near Jhalaria Math
 Mathura Das Ji Ka Jaav in Gaadha Baas
 pathano ki paanch pol the historic palace
 Inderpur is 13 kilometers from Didwana on Salasar Highway.  Earlier this city was extent in between seven big gates, for security. But now six gates exist, as one (Delhi Gate) gate has vanished.  One thing is special for these gates that at each gate The Lord Ganesh Temple are situated.
The name of the gates are:
 Nagori Gate
 Ajmeri Gate
 Kote Gate
 Deen Darwaja
 Khidki Darwaja (Chapri Gate)
 Fatehpuri Gate
 Delhi Gate (this does not exist now)

After the rise of the Bangur family who stayed in Sitaram Bagh, the Bangur family had built many schools, a college, hospital, roads and other infrastructural facilities in the town. Thus the city was one of the most prominent town in the Rajasthan State and important center from people from nearby villages and towns such as Ladnun, Kuchaman, Merta, Sujangarh, Kishangarh, Molasar, and Borsu.

Not only the town but also people from nearby places is indebted to the Bangur Family for its important role played in the development of the town.

Physical and Climate 
Didwana City is an additional district headquarters near the north-eastern border of Nagaur district of Rajasthan. The city is located 160 km from Jaipur, 237 from Jodhpur, 180 from Bikaner, 150 from Ajmer, 95 from Nagaur, 360 km from Delhi. It is in the west of the Aravalli ranges and in the eastern part of the Thar Desert with semi-arid and warm climate. In the south-west of the city, there is a hill, symbolizing the residual of Aravali, called Tikhali Dungri and Pir Pahari. The climate of the city is very hot and summer. The average temperature here is 28 to 48 degrees in summer and 3 to 23 degrees in winter. Apart from the short-term southwest monsoon, humidity is very low here. It receives an average of 33 cm of rainfall during the rainy season.

Place of interest 
 Nagauri Gate-In the First World War year 1914–1919, there were 77 brave martyrs from Didwana Pargana, in whose memory the Nagori Gate was constructed in Didwana and Nagori Gate, in the memory of the 77 martyrs, there is also an inscription of war.
 JankiNath Temple (Jhalariya Math)
 Shree Shyam Maharaj Ji Ka Mandir 
 JankiNath Temple (Nagoriya Math)
 Shree shringi balaji mandir and pond
 Hinglaj Mata Ji Mandir, (Bhataknath Road)
 Peer Pahari
 Dojraj Ganesh Mandir
 Padhay Mata Ji mandir (devpura)
 Shitalkund Balaji
 Shree Hanuman Ghat Bagichi
 Shiv Bari temple
 Sain Samaj Mandir
 Sati Mata Mandir (Aadka Bass)
 Kali Mata Mandir AKHADA (Bhati Bass)
 Maliyan Surya Mandir (Singhi Bass)
 Qila Masjid
 kala Mandir (cinema Hall)
 Shree Shriyade Mata Mandir (Prajapat Bhawan)
 Madina Masjid Salt Road,
 Man Jumma masjid Sadar Bazar,
 Kachri Wali Masjid Aanad Bawan,
 Markaz Masjid (Fatapuri gate)
 Masjid pay jaanat ( hamid colony)
 Mustafa masjid (baliya road)
 darul hanafi garib nawaz madrasah (baliya road)
 Kunjar para masjid
 parshuram bhavan

Grounds 
 Mirdha park (gandhi ground), cricket ground as well as football ground
 Mohandas Bass ground (known as Baag) cricket ground
 Kishan hostel (jat hostel), special type of cricket ground as off and on boundaries are small as compare to straight, but games are more interesting due to special rules
 Shivaji Stadium Dadu Badi Singhi Bass
 Yogi Khel Stadium, Mega Highway ( Cricket & basketball )
Saini chatrawas,Gadha bass 
Behind royal collection,Near bus stop,Didwana

Demographics 
 India census, Didwana is Tehsil in Rajasthan state, As per the 2021 Aadhar estimates, Didwana Tehsil population in 2021 is 492,284. According to 2011 census of India, Total Didwana population is 397,003 people are living in this Tehsil, of which 202,303 are male and 194,700 are female. Population of Didwana in 2020 is 476,404 Literate people are 226,426 out of 139,916 are male and 86,510 are female. Total workers are 155,998 depends on multi skills out of which 97,012 are men and 58,986 are women. Total 43,918 Cultivators are depended on agriculture farming out of 29,277 are cultivated by men and 14,641 are women. 9,932 people works in agricultural land as a labour in Didwana, men are 7,430 and 2,502 are women. Didwana has an average literacy rate of 62%, more than the national average of 59.5%: male literacy is 70% and, female literacy is 54%. In Didwana, 17% of the population is under 6 years of age.

Transportation 
Didwana is connected to major cities by road and rail in terms of traffic.

1- Railway: - The city is an important station on the Jodhpur-Delhi railroad of Jodhpur division of North West Railway. On 16 September 1909, the then Jodhpur state started the Degana-Sujangarh railway line and joined Didwana by rail service. Under which the station was built at the western end of the city. A station was also built at Marwad Balia, 5 km from the city, for salt loading. This railroad was broad gauged after 100 years of gauge conversion. At present Didwana is an E grade class station. City has direct trains to some important cities of India like Mumbai, New Delhi, Jodhpur, Surat, Ahemdabad, Vadodara, Hisar, Jalandhar, Jammu, Kamakhya etc.

The following trains halt at Didwana railway station in both directions:

 Bandra Terminus - Jammu Tawi Vivek Express
 Jodhpur - Delhi Sarai Rohilla Superfast Express
 Bhagat Ki Kothi - Delhi Sarai Rohilla Salasar Superfast Express
 Bhagat Ki Kothi - Kamakhya Express
 Bandra Terminus - Hisar Superfast Express
 Barmer - Howrah Superfast Express

2- Roadways- Didwana is situated on the Hanumangarh-Kishangarh megaway, as well as Pushkar-Salasar, Nagaur-Mukundgarh, National Highway No. 65-A also passes through here. The ring road is built around the city and the city is equipped with all the major thoroughfares and dividers. The city also has two bridge that remain on the Jodhpur-Delhi railroad, the third bridge is under construction on the Kuchaman-Nagaur bypass. Didwana has depot of the State Road Transport Corporation from which buses are operated for all major cities both state and inter-state.

Didwana's Political Personalities 
Didwana has been an influential center of politics in Rajasthan and India. This city has given the politics of Rajasthan as Deputy Chief Minister, Assembly Speaker, Party President, MP, Cabinet and Minister of State.

Pt. Bachharaj Vyas: -

Pt. Bachraj Raj Vyas, a resident of Didwana, a Poet, was born on 24 September 1916. Pandit Vyas continued to work from the Union Headquarters in Nagpur. At the behest of Balasaheb and Hedgewar, Bachhraj Ji continued to promote the Sangh in Rajasthan from 1944 to 1947, during which Shri Vyas gave glory to the city by establishing the first branch of the Rashtriya Swayamsevak Sangh in his hometown Didwana.Pandit Vyas was made the national president of Jana Sangh in 1965. Vyas had direct contact with Pandit Deendayal Upadhyay, Dr. Shyama Prasad Mukherjee, Atal Bihari Vajpayee, LK Advani. Vyas was a member of the Maharashtra Legislative Council from 1958 to 1962. He died in 1972. In the memory of Vyas, an intersection of Nagpur was named after him and Adarsh Vidya Mandir was constructed in Didwana and Nagpur. Pt. Vyas's son Girish Vyas is currently the President of Maharashtra Legislative Council.

Mathuradas Mathur: -

Mathuradas Mathur, a freedom fighter and resident of Jodhpur, was elected the first MLA of Didwana. He represented Didwana thrice in the Rajasthan Legislative Assembly in 1952, 1967 and 1977, which is the record for Didwana seat. In 1967, Mohanlal also served as a minister in the Sukhaliya government. Mathur became an MP by winning from Nagaur seat in the second Lok Sabha election. In his memory, Mathuradas Mathur Hospital in Jodhpur remains.

Gumanmal Lodha: -

Born on 15 March 1926 in Didwana, Gumanmal Lodha practiced in Jodhpur. Born in Jodhpur, Mathuradas Mathur made Didwana, and Lodha, a resident of Didwana, made Jodhpur his work place. Lodha contested from Jodhpur city seat in 1962 and 1967 as a candidate for Jana Sangh but lost both times. He was the President of Rajasthan unit of Jana Sangh from 1969 to 1971, became MLA from Jodhpur city seat in 1972 and became leader of Jana Sangh in assembly. In 1978, Lodha was appointed a judge of the Rajasthan High Court. Became Chief Justice of Assam High Court in 1988. In 1989, 1991 and 1996, Lodha was elected as a BJP candidate from the Pali parliamentary constituency. Lodha died in the year 2009.

Harishankar Bhabhra:-

Bhabhala, former Deputy Chief Minister of Rajasthan, was born on 6 August 1928 in Didwana. Join the Quit India Movement of 1942. After independence, Bhabha was also treasurer and vice-president of the state unit of Bharatiya Jana Sangh. In 1963, Didwana was the only municipality in Rajasthan with a majority of non-Congress members, Bhabha became its president. Spent 18 months in jail in emergency. Spent 18 months in jail in emergency. From 1978 to 1984, Bhabha was a member of Rajya Sabha. He was an MLA from Ratangarh seat in Churu district from 1985 to 1993. Bhabha was elected Speaker of the 9th and 10th Vidhan Sabha. In 1994 Bhairon Singh became the Deputy Chief Minister in the Shekhawat government. Bhabha was defeated in the 2003 elections but received the status of cabinet minister in the Vasundhara government.

Yunus Khan:-

Born in Sikar's Ganani, Yunus Khan received his education from the Government Bangla College, Didwana. After this, Khan served as the Development Officer of Life Insurance Corporation of India. After getting in touch with Bhairon Singh Shekhawat, he contested from Deedwana in 1998 as BJP candidate but was defeated. In 2003, Vasundhara Raje became the Sports and Traffic Minister in the government after winning the election from Didwana. Yunus Khan was the only BJP Muslim MLA from all over North India during this period. Lost in the 2008 election. He won from Didwana for the second time in 2013 and became the Minister of Transport and Civil Affairs in the government. The 2018 election was fought against Tonk against state Congress President Sachin Pilot but was defeated.

Dr Manish Kumar Ojha
2013 to 2021 bjp youth president, 2017 to 2020 executive working committee member of bjp Yuva morcha Rajsthan, 2022 to till district secretary of bjp Nagour.

MLA of Didwana: -

1. Mathuradas Mathur: - Year 1952 (Congress)

2. Motilal: - Year 1957 (Congress)

3. Motilal: - Year 1962 (Congress)

4. Mathuradas Mathur: - 1967 (Congress)

5. Bhomaram: - Year 1972 (Swatantra Party)

6. Mathuradas Mathur: - Year 1977 (Congress)

7. Ummed Singh: - Year 1980 (Janata Party)

8. Bhanvaram Supka: - Year 1985 (Congress)

9. Ummed Singh: - Year 1990 (Janata Dal)

10. Chenaram Chaudhary: - Year 1993 (Independent)

11. Ruparam Dudi: - Year 1998 (Congress)

12. Yunus Khan: - Year 2003 (BJP)

13. Ruparam Dudi: - Year 2008 (Congress)

14. Yunus Khan: - Year 2013 (BJP)

15 Chetan Dudi: - Year 2018 (Congress)

References 

Cities and towns in Nagaur district